Events from the year 1802 in Russia

Incumbents
 Monarch – Alexander I

Events

  College of War
 
  
  Imperial Philanthropic Society
 
 
  
 Moscow School of the Order of St Catherine
 Caucasus Governorate
 Chernigov Governorate
 Kherson Governorate
 Ministry of Finance of the Russian Empire
 Ministry of Justice of the Russian Empire
 Ministry of National Education (Russian Empire)
 Ministry of War of the Russian Empire
 Poltava Governorate
 Tartu University Library
 Vitebsk Governorate
 Yekaterinoslav Governorate

Births

Deaths

 - Ivan Lepyokhin, Russian naturalist, zoologist, botanist and explorer. (b. 1740)

References

1802 in Russia
Years of the 19th century in the Russian Empire